Osuský is a surname. It may refer to:

Peter Osuský, a Slovak politician and candidate to the 2014 Slovak presidential election
Štefan Osuský (1889–1973), Austro-Hungarian born Slovak lawyer, diplomat, politician and university professor

See also
Osuské, a village and municipality in Senica District in the Trnava Region of western Slovakia